Henri Van Assche (1774–1841) was a Belgian painter.

Van Assche was born in Brussels on 30 August 1774. From his earliest years he showed a predilection for painting, and received from his father, who was a distinguished amateur artist, the first principles of design and perspective. He was afterwards placed with Deroy of Brussels, from whom he received further instructions in painting. Journeys in Switzerland and Italy contributed to develop his talent as a landscape painter. His great partiality for representing waterfalls, mountain streams, and mills gained for him the name of 'The Painter of Waterfalls.' Several pictures by him may be seen in public and private collections of Brussels, Ghent, Lille, and Haarlem, some of which are enriched with figures and animals by Balthasar Paul Ommeganck. He died in Brussels on 10 April 1841.

His niece Isabelle Catherine van Assche, was a pupil. Her sister, Amélie van Assche, was a miniaturist.

Notes

References

External links
 

1774 births
1841 deaths
Flemish landscape painters
Belgian painters
Artists from Brussels
18th-century Flemish painters
19th-century Flemish painters